David Hamilton (born 10 September 1938) is an English radio and television presenter.

Since his broadcasting career began in 1959, Hamilton has hosted over 12,000 radio shows and more than 1,000 TV shows. He is usually known as 'Diddy David Hamilton', a name given to him by the comedian Ken Dodd.

Early life
Hamilton attended Glastonbury Road Grammar School at St Helier in Surrey until the age of 17. While at school he became a columnist on the weekly national magazine Soccer Star. He performed national service in the Royal Air Force from 1959.

TV career
On leaving school, Hamilton became a script-writer for the TV series Portrait of a Star.

Following his national service, he became an in-vision television announcer for ABC Weekend TV based in Didsbury, Manchester, and appeared with close friend Ken Dodd in the TV series Doddy's Music Box, acquiring the nickname 'Diddy'. Throughout the 1960s, he hosted shows for the ITV franchises Tyne Tees, Anglia and Westward.

He joined the then-new Thames Television as an announcer in 1968, subsequently hosting many shows for them including Miss TV Times, TV Times Gala Awards, The World Disco Dance Championships, as well as many outside broadcasts, circus and sports shows. He appeared alongside comedians Benny Hill and Tommy Cooper and hosted Thames TV's showcase weeks on television in New York City and Los Angeles. Later he hosted ATV's Saturday night series Up For the Cup, and four series of TVS's hangman-style game show All Clued Up.

For BBC TV, he hosted Top of the Pops and Seaside Special and the Eurovision Song Contest Previews in 1986. For seven years, he was the main host of one of the earliest satellite TV stations, Lifestyle. Hamilton was one of the final people on the network when it closed on 24 January 1993, appearing on the final segment wishing viewers goodbye.

In February 2012, he danced to the 1988 Salt-N-Pepa hit "Push It" with fellow DJ and close friend Tony Blackburn as contestants on the charity show Let's Dance for Sport Relief.

Radio career

BBC Radio
Hamilton made his broadcasting debut with the British Forces Network in Cologne in Germany during his national service in 1959. His first UK broadcast was as the host of The Beat Show from the Playhouse Theatre, Manchester, in 1962. He hosted the show on the BBC Light Programme until 1965. He presented the final edition of Housewives' Choice in 1967 and was first heard on BBC Radio 1 in November 1967, presenting Family Choice. By the late 1960s, Hamilton was presenting many shows for BBC radio, including Music Through Midnight, Roundabout, Pop Inn, Radio 1 Club and shows featuring the music of Frank Chacksfield.

In 1970, he joined the team of Late Night Extra and in 1973 was offered his own daily show on Radio 1 every weekday afternoon from 2pm to 5pm. In 1975, the show was simultaneously broadcast on Radio 1 and Radio 2 (listeners being able to hear the show in stereophonic sound on Radio 2's VHF frequency), giving it the largest British audience of the day. In December 1977, the show moved to Radio 2 and remained there until the end of 1986 when Hamilton quit the station, complaining of its 'geriatric' music policy.

Commercial radio
Since January 1987, Hamilton has been heard on many commercial stations in the UK. He joined Reading's Radio 210 initially to present a mid-morning show from 9am to 12 noon although the show was quickly brought forward an hour, starting at 8am. He then joined Capital Gold in November 1988 to present its daily 10am to 1pm show. In addition to that, he also presented a weekly oldies show which was heard on various ILR stations around the UK. This was usually heard on a Sunday afternoon.

In late 1994, Hamilton presented the Breakfast show on Melody FM (now Magic 105.4) for four years before moving to London's Liberty Radio to present an afternoon show. He also did a show on the Classic Gold Network on a Sunday.

In 2000, he joined PrimeTime Radio, presenting the weekday mid-morning show, where he remained until its demise in 2006. In October 2001, he left Classic Gold and presented the breakfast show on Birmingham's Saga 105.7 FM before moving to Nottingham's Saga 106.6 FM in early 2003. From 2004 to 2006, he was heard on radio stations around the UK, presenting his Million Sellers show, which would usually go out on a Saturday lunchtime, and was repeated at midnight. Around this time he also had a sojourn at Big L 1395.

In April 2012, Hamilton was one of the launch presenters on The Wireless, an Internet-based radio station operated by Age UK and aimed at older people throughout the UK.

He was a founder director of Lite FM in Peterborough  and Splash FM in Worthing,  hosting the first programme with guest Leo Sayer in 2003.

In February 2021 he started a daily lunchtime show with Boom Radio, the national DAB station aimed at the baby boom generation.

Stage
On stage Hamilton has compered shows by the Beatles, the Rolling Stones, David Cassidy and many other pop acts. He has hosted shows at the Royal Albert Hall and the London Palladium, and headlined in four major pantomimes.

In 2016 he embarked on a 40-theatre tour, David Hamilton's Rock 'n' Roll Back The Years, with band The Fugitives, and singers.

Sport
Hamilton was the compere for the Wembley Lions Speedway team in 1970 and 1971.
During the 1970s Hamilton was also the match day presenter for the Reading Racers Speedway Club. Latterly he was seen frequently on BBC1's Match of the Day and BSkyB's Football First as he was the matchday compère at Fulham F.C.

Books
Hamilton is the author of five books:  David Hamilton's Beauty Tips for Women, 1974, The Music Game (autobiography), 1986, A Fulhamish Tale, 2012, The Golden Days of Radio One, 2017 and Commercial Radio Daze, 2020.

Current work
In 2019 Hamilton celebrated 60 years in broadcasting.   By this time he was heard regularly on his local stations BBC Radio Sussex and BBC Radio Surrey.   His Million Sellers show continues to be aired on several stations in the UK and abroad. 

In 2021, at the age of 82, he became the oldest broadcaster to do a daily show on national radio with his lunchtime show on Boom Radio.   
The same year David Hamilton`s Million Sellers and David Hamilton`s Hotshots launched on the Now 70s music television channel and he was a guest on Britain`s Biggest 70s Hits on Channel 5.   He was seen as a newspaper reviewer on Sky News and in 2022 on GB News.

He is very much in demand as a lunch/dinner speaker where he talks about 60 years in broadcasting.

Television

References

External links
 David Hamilton's Official website
 David Hamilton on Boom Radio
 British Entertainment History Project. David Hamilton
 Neil Sean Meets David Hamilton.
 Tailor Made Radio: David Hamilton's Million Sellers.

1938 births
Living people
20th-century Royal Air Force personnel
BBC Radio 1 presenters
BBC Radio 2 presenters
English game show hosts
English radio DJs
English television presenters
Mass media people from Manchester
Radio and television announcers
Top of the Pops presenters